Christopher Sower may refer to any one of a father-son-grandson trio:

 Christopher Sower (elder), American printer (1693–1758)
 Christopher Sower (younger), American printer (1721–1784)
 Christopher Sower III, American printer (1754–1799)